is a cemetery in Aoyama, Minato, Tokyo, Japan, managed by the Tokyo Metropolitan Government.  The cemetery is also famous for its cherry blossoms, and at the season of hanami, which many people would visit.

History

The cemetery was originally the land of the Aoyama family of the Gujō clan (now Gujō, Gifu) in the province of Mino (now Gifu). Japan's first public cemetery was opened in 1874, and in the Meiji era was the main locations of foreigners' graves.

The cemetery has an area of 263,564 m2.

Japanese section

The Japanese section includes the graves of many notable Japanese, including:
 Hachikō
 Amino Kiku
 Gotō Shōjirō
 Ichikawa Danjūrō IX
 Ichikawa Danjūrō XI
 Kitasato Shibasaburō
 Nakae Chōmin
 Nogi Maresuke
 Ōkubo Toshimichi
 Otoya Yamaguchi
 Sasaki Takayuki
 Shiga Naoya
 Nishi Takeichi
Osachi Hamaguchi
Hidesaburō Ueno

Tateyama Branch

The cemetery also has a Tateyama branch, where Nagata Tetsuzan, Kimura Heitarō, and Sagara Sōzō are buried.

Grave of Hachikō

One of the cemetery's most famous graves is that of Hachikō, the faithful and dutiful dog whose statue adorns Shibuya Station, was buried alongside  his two owners, Hidesaburō Ueno and Yaeko Sakano.

Foreign section

The cemetery includes a gaikokujin bochi (foreign cemetery), one of the few such plots in Tokyo. Many of the graves are of foreign experts who came to Japan at the end of the 19th century, as part of the Meiji Government's drive for modernisation. Although some of the graves were threatened with removal in 2005 due to unpaid annual fees, the Foreign Section was awarded special protection in 2007. A plaque on the site recognises the men and women who contributed to Japan's modernization.

Some of the noted foreigners buried within the cemetery:

 Thomas Baty (1869–1954), English transgender lawyer, writer and activist
 Francis Brinkley (1841–1912), Anglo-Irish journalist and scholar
 Edoardo Chiossone  (1833–1898), Italian engraver
 W. K. Burton (1856–1899), Scottish engineer and photographer
 Edwin Dun (1848–1931), American agricultural advisor.
 William Clark Eastlake (1834–1887), American dentist, "Dental Pioneer of the Orient"
 Hugh Fraser (1837–1894), British Envoy Extraordinary and Minister Plenipotentiary to Japan
 Flora B. Harris, American missionary and translator, wife of Merriman Colbert Harris
 Merriman Colbert Harris (1846–1921), American Methodist missionary
 Henry Hartshorne (1823–1897), American Quaker missionary and doctor, father of Anna Hartshorne
 Joseph Heco (1837–1897), the first naturalized Japanese-American
 Paul Jacoulet (1902–1960), French woodblock print artist in the Japanese style
 Arthur Lloyd (1852–1911), English Anglican Church in Japan minister, Keio University professor and translator
 Henry Spencer Palmer (1838–1893) British engineer and journalist
 Julius Scriba (1848–1905), German surgeon
 Alexander Croft Shaw (1846–1902), Canadian Anglican Church in Japan minister, Keio University professor
 Frederick William Strange (1853–1889), British. University instructor, founder of competitive rowing in Japan
 Guido Verbeck (1830–1898), Dutch political advisor, educator, and missionary
 Gottfried Wagener (1831–1892), German chemist, educator and ceramics specialist
 Charles Dickinson West (1847–1908), Irish engineer

See also
 Zōshigaya cemetery
 Yanaka cemetery

References

 This article was originally translated from the Japanese Wikipedia article :ja:青山霊園, accessed December 16, 2007
 Who is Buried in the Foreign Section?, The Foreign Section Trust.
 "Resting in Pieces", Metropolis

Cemeteries in Japan
Hanami spots of Japan
Tourist attractions in Tokyo
Buildings and structures in Minato, Tokyo
1874 establishments in Japan